Sir Thomas Hackett (died 1706) was an Irish Jacobite official and merchant.

Hackett was the son of James Hackett and Alison White. He was engaged in foreign trade out of Dublin by 1666, and became a banker to many Old English Roman Catholic families in Ireland. In October 1687, he was knighted and appointed Lord Mayor of Dublin by James II of England. He was the Member of Parliament for Portarlington in the brief Patriot Parliament called by James II in 1689. He was made a Deputy Lieutenant of Dublin and a justice of the peace.

The Jacobite defeat in Ireland in 1690 resulted in Hackett being outlawed and most of his properties were seized. As a result, he became deeply indebted. In 1694 he had a pass to go to the Dutch Republic, where his activities were monitored by English government officials who believed him to be an agent of the Jacobite court in exile at Château de Saint-Germain-en-Laye. He was granted legal protection in Dublin in 1700 after testifying in a legal dispute over forfeited lands, but had been imprisoned in Dublin for debt by 1705. He died the following year.

References

Year of birth unknown
1706 deaths
17th-century Irish people
Deputy Lieutenants of Dublin (city)
Irish bankers
Irish Jacobites
Irish justices of the peace
Irish knights
Irish merchants
Irish MPs 1689
Lord Mayors of Dublin
Members of the Parliament of Ireland (pre-1801) for Queen's County constituencies